Sophie Piper was a Swedish countess.

Sophie Piper may also refer to:

Sophie Piper (Halloweentown)
Sophie Piper (Love Island)